Collaria oculata is a species of plant bug in the family Miridae. It is found in Central America and North America.

References

Further reading

External links

 

Articles created by Qbugbot
Insects described in 1876
Stenodemini